Basileus Quartet is a 1983 Italian  film. It stars actor Gabriele Ferzetti.

Cast
 Héctor Alterio	as 	Alvaro
 Omero Antonutti	as 	Diego
 Pierre Malet	as	Edo
 François Simon	as	Oscar Guarneri
 Michel Vitold	as Guglielmo
 Alain Cuny	as 	Finkel
 Gabriele Ferzetti	as	Mario Cantone
 Véronique Genest	as	Sophia
 Lisa Kreuzer	as Lotte
 Mimsy Farmer	as	Miss Permamint
 Rada Rassimov	as 	Madame Finkal	
 Alessandro Haber

Reception
The film was nominated for Best Foreign Language Film of 1984 by the U.S. National Board of Review of Motion Pictures.

See also
 Italian films of 1983

References

External links

1983 films
Italian drama films
1980s Italian-language films
Films directed by Fabio Carpi
1980s Italian films